Bathsheba Wilson Bigler Smith (May 3, 1822 – September 20, 1910) was an early member of the Latter Day Saint movement. She was the fourth general president of the Relief Society of the Church of Jesus Christ of Latter-day Saints (LDS Church), matron of the Salt Lake Temple, member of the Board of Directors of Deseret Hospital, Salt Lake City, Utah, and a leader in the western United States woman's suffrage movement.

Early life and Missouri
Born near Shinnston, Harrison County, Virginia (now West Virginia), she was the daughter of Mark Bigler and Susanna Ogden. When she was young, Bathsheba traded names with a friend as a symbol of their friendship, which is where the "Wilson" part of Bathsheba's name comes from.

When Bathsheba was 15, she heard about the Mormon gospel from members of the Latter Day Saint movement. She believed in the church's message, and she was baptized on August 21, 1837, alongside her family. Soon after the family's conversion, they desired to move to Missouri along with other members of the church.

These excerpts from her autobiography tell how her family moved from Virginia, first to Missouri, and then to Illinois:

On September 23, 1839, her father, Mark Bigler, died in Quincy.

Nauvoo, Illinois

In Nauvoo, Illinois on July 25, 1841, Bathsheba Bigler married George A. Smith who was the youngest member of the Quorum of the Twelve Apostles of the Church of Christ at that time. Bathsheba gave birth to their first child, George Albert Jr., on July 7, 1842. Several months after the birth, George A. left to the Eastern States to serve a mission. Upon his return to Nauvoo in 1843, George and Bathsheba received the ordinances of endowments and sealing. In 1844, Smith's husband left once again on a mission. He returned in August in time for the birth of the couple's daughter, Bathsheba, on August 14, 1844.

Smith kept a diary and sketchbook for most of her life which included drawings of prominent members of the Latter Day Saint community. Among the best known is a profile of church president Joseph Smith.

Bathsheba and Eliza R. Snow designed the original temple garment, at Joseph Smith's request.

Salt Lake City, Utah
During the succession crisis that occurred after the assassination of Smith, Bathsheba Smith, her husband and two children joined the Latter Day Saint group following Brigham Young. They traveled west and established themselves first in Salt Lake City. While other members of the family later moved to southern Utah, Smith spent the rest of her life in Salt Lake City. Bathsheba and George A. Smith were the parents of three children. Their son, George A. Smith Jr., was killed by Navajo while on his way to serve a mission with Jacob Hamblin to the Hopi. Their daughter, Bathsheba, married Clarence Merrill, among whose children was Alice Merrill Horne. Their third child, John, died the day of his birth, April 14, 1847, in Winter Quarters, Nebraska. Smith also largely raised her sister's daughter, Julina Lambson, who later became a wife of Joseph F. Smith.

During the early 1870s, George A. Smith served as first counselor in the First Presidency under Young. He and his wife traveled to many emerging Mormon settlements, preaching and promoting church affairs.

After the death of her husband in 1875, Smith became active in civic affairs and locally involved in the women's suffrage movement, primarily through articles she wrote for the Woman's Exponent. For many years, starting at Nauvoo, Smith was also heavily involved in temple work, and was the matron of the Salt Lake temple.

General Relief Society leadership
In 1888, Smith became the second counselor in the Relief Society general presidency. In this position, she heavily encouraged home production of clothing. She was called to serve as general president of the Relief Society in 1901 and served in the position until her death in 1910. During her administration, the original Relief Society Building was completed (in 1909) and helped introduce classes on childrearing, industry, and marriage. In addition, the General Relief Society established an employment bureau for young women, educational nursing and mother's courses, and food storage plans under Smith's leadership. Smith was also on the board of directors at the Deseret Hospital and served in the Retrenchment Association presidency.

She was among those called to testify before the Smoot hearings, but due to ill health, was only able to file an affidavit.

Death and burial 
Smith died on September 20, 1910, and was buried at Salt Lake City Cemetery. She was the first woman to have her funeral in the Salt Lake Tabernacle.

See also
Annie Taylor Hyde
List of General Presidencies of the Relief Society

Notes

References

External links 

 George A. Smith Family Papers, University of Utah
 Autobiography of Bathsheba W. Smith, University of Utah 
Diary of Bathsheba W. Bigler Smith, University of Utah

1822 births
1910 deaths
American leaders of the Church of Jesus Christ of Latter-day Saints
American suffragists
American women's rights activists
Burials at Salt Lake City Cemetery
Converts to Mormonism
Counselors in the General Presidency of the Relief Society
General Presidents of the Relief Society
Latter Day Saints from Illinois
Latter Day Saints from Missouri
Latter Day Saints from Utah
Latter Day Saints from West Virginia
Mormon feminists
Mormon pioneers
People from Shinnston, West Virginia
Smith family (Latter Day Saints)
Temple presidents and matrons (LDS Church)